Helle may refer to:

People

 Alternate spelling of George de La Hèle, Renaissance composer

Places

Belgium
 Helle (stream), a 25-km-long stream in Belgium that rises in the Eifel mountains

Denmark
 Helle Municipality, a former municipality in the Southern Region of Denmark

Germany
 Helle, a part of the town of Balve in the Märkischer Kreis bihcurtsNorth Rhine-Westphalia, Germany
Helle (Orke), a river of North Rhine-Westphalia, Germany, tributary of the Orke
Helle (Spüligbach), a river of Lower Saxony, Germany, tributary of the Spüligbach

Netherlands
 Helle, Nuth, a hamlet in Nuth Municipality, in the province of Limburg
 Helle, Gulpen-Wittem, a hamlet in Gulpen-Wittem Municipality, in the province of Limburg

Norway
 Helle, Agder, a village in Flekkefjord Municipality, Agder county
 Helle, Møre og Romsdal, a village in Ålesund Municipality, Møre og Romsdal county
 Helle, Nordland, a village in Vestvågøy Municipality, Nordland county
 Helle, Sunnfjord, a village in Sunnfjord Municipality, Vestland county
 Helle, Telemark, a village in Kragerø municipality, Vestfold og Telemark county
 Helle, Vaksdal, a village in Vaksdal Municipality, Vestland county

Other
 Helle (mythology), a figure in Greek mythology
 Hellé (film), of 1972 by Roger Vadim
 Helle (fly), a genus of small-headed flies endemic to New Zealand
 Helle, A/S, Norway's largest knife company, located in Holmedal, Askvoll Municipality, Vestland county

See also
 Hall (disambiguation)
 Halle (disambiguation)
 Hel (disambiguation)
 Hell (disambiguation)